Catocala artobolevskiji is a moth in the family Erebidae first described by Leo Sheljuzhko in 1943. It is found in Uzbekistan.

References

artobolevskiji
Moths described in 1943
Moths of Asia